Elk Lake is a lake in Grant County, in the U.S. state of Minnesota.

Elk Lake was named for the elk seen there by pioneer settlers.

See also
List of lakes in Minnesota

References

Lakes of Minnesota
Lakes of Grant County, Minnesota